John Sekula (January 14, 1969 – October 28, 2010) was the original guitarist for heavy metal band Mushroomhead.

Biography
Also known as J.J. Righteous, Sekula was mostly identified as wearing an Ace Frehley mask, a welding mask, a troll-like monster mask and a Ghostface mask. He was replaced by Marko "Bronson" Vukcevich in 2001 after several issues with drugs. Sekula also played guitar for both State of Conviction and Unified Culture who are/were fronted by Mushroomhead vocalist Jason Popson.

Death
On October 28, 2010, Sekula suffered a massive heart failure and subsequently died. He was 41 years old.

Discography

Mushroomhead
 Mushroomhead (1995)
 Superbuick (1996)
 Remix (1997)
 M3 (1999)
 XX (2001)
 Remix 2000 (2002)

1969 births
2010 deaths
Guitarists from Ohio
American heavy metal guitarists
Place of birth missing
American male guitarists
20th-century American guitarists
20th-century American male musicians